Sthanam Narasimha Rao, popularly known as Sthanam (23 September 1902 – 21 February 1971), was an Indian actor known for his works in Telugu theatre and Telugu cinema. He was known for playing female characters and was a recipient of a Padma Sri Award.
His depiction of the Sringara rasa as Satyabhama in Srikrishna tulabharam kept audiences spellbound. Equally enchanting performances in Roshanara, Deva Devi in Vipranarayana and the eponymous Chintamani made his place in Telugu theater permanent. His most memorable acting, however, was as Madhuravani in Gurajada Appa Rao's comedy Kanyasulkam.

Sthanam had over 1,500 performances to his credit. His productions of classics on All India Radio include Kanyasulkam and Ganapati. He acted in Telugu films such as (Radhakrishna in 1939 and Satyabhama in 1941) and authored a book about his vast acting experience entitled, Natasthanam. He wrote the song 'Meerajalagalada' in the movie 'Sri Krishna Tulabharam'.
He was felicitated in Rangoon and gifted golden crown in 1938. His Sashtipoorti was grandly celebrated in 1962 at Hyderabad.

Early life
He was born in 1902 at Bapatla of Guntur district to Hanumantha Rao and Ademma. He entered the theatre in 1920 and, rigorously trained by Veeraraghava Swamy, played for the Rama Vilasa Sabha of nearby Tenali. For nearly four decades (1924–60).

Death
He died in 1971.

Awards
 He was recipient of Padma Shri from Government of India in 1956. 
 He received the Sangeet Natak Akademi Award for Acting in 1961.
 He received Gajarohanam in Chennai

References

 Nata Ratnalu, Mikkilineni Radhakrishna Murthy, Second edition, 2002.
 Luminaries of 20th Century, Potti Sreeramulu Telugu University, Hyderabad, 2005.

External links
 

Male actors in Telugu cinema
Indian male stage actors
Indian male film actors
1902 births
1971 deaths
Recipients of the Padma Shri in arts
Recipients of the Sangeet Natak Akademi Award
20th-century Indian male actors
Male actors from Andhra Pradesh
People from Guntur district
Telugu male actors
Andhra University alumni
Male actors in Telugu theatre